11th OTO Awards

SND, Bratislava, Slovakia

Overall winner  Lukáš Latinák

Hall of Fame  Stanislav Dančiak

Život Award  Peter Bielik – Téma dňa

◄ 10th | 12th ►

The 11th OTO Awards, honoring the best in Slovak popular culture for the year 2010, took time and place on March 12, 2011 at the new premises of the Slovak National Theater in Bratislava. The ceremony broadcast live RTVS on 1. The host of the show was musician Marián Čekovský.

Presenters

 Marián Čekovský
 Daniel Dangl
 Michal Hudák
 Róbert Jakab
 Juraj Kemka
 Daniel Krajcer
 Juraj Lelkes
 Marián Miezga
 Diana Mórová
 Lukáš Latinák
 Roman Pomajbo
 Stefan Skrúcaný
 Richard Stanke
 Peter Sklár
 Elena Vacvalová

Performers
 Marián Čekovský, singer
 Martin Chodúr and Anita Soul, singers
 Sisa Sklovská, singer

Winners and nominees

Main categories
 Television

 Music

Others

Superlatives

Multiple nominees
 2 nominations
 Gabriela Dzuríková
 Ľuboš Kostelný
 Janko Kroner

References

External links
 Archive > OTO 2010 – 11th edition  (Official website)
 OTO 2010 – 11th edition (Official website - old)
 Winners (at TopStar.sk)
 Nominees - Top 7 list (at Hospodárske noviny)

OTO Awards
2010 in Slovak music
2010 in Slovak television
2010 television awards